Hylaeaicum roseum is a species of flowering plant in the family Bromeliaceae, endemic to Peru. It was first described by Lyman Bradford Smith in 1963 as Neoregelia rosea.

References

Bromelioideae
Flora of Peru
Plants described in 1963